Nenu Meeku Telusa...? ( Do you know me...?) is a 2008 Indian Telugu-language psychological thriller film directed by Ajay Sastry and produced by Lakshmi Manchu. The film stars Manoj Manchu, Sneha Ullal and Riya Sen while Nassar and Brahmanandam play supporting roles  The film's songs are composed by Achu and Dharan with score by Santhosh Narayanan & Shakti. 

Released in Tamil as Ennai Theriyuma... ?, the film is inspired from 1994 Hollywood movie Clean Slate.

Plot
Aditya (Manchu Manoj) is a short-term memory loss patient. He suffers a brain-damaging accident in which his father (P. Vasu) dies. In order to continue with his day-to-day activities, he depends on an audio cassette timed every morning by himself the previous night. His uncle (Nassar) and his doctor are the only people who know about his medical condition. Aditya has a girlfriend named Madhumitha (Riya Sen). He has two important rules in his everyday regimen. The first rule is to not to get drunk outside, and the second rule is that no matter where he goes, he has to ensure that he sleeps only in his home. He has to listen the tape in the next morning or else he will not remember anything.

One day, all of Aditya's friends in the office call him to a party and force him to drink. Aditya gets fully drunk and wakes up in his bedroom the next morning, but the tape he uses everyday to refresh his memory is erased, and he has no clue who did it. He starts to reconstruct his memories by whatever is available in his sight. As he starts to leave his flat, the police comes and interrogates him and asks him that he has complained about a missing car. As Aditya does not remember, he denies giving a complaint; however, the police finds the car in the basement parking. They open the car and find Aditya's uncle's dead body in the car's trunk. Aditya gets arrested. The police initially thinks that he is lying, but eventually when he is submitted to court, the judge submits him for medical examination, and they come to understand that he is a short-term memory loss patient. As the case is still not solved, police officer Anjali (Sneha Ullal) takes up the case by specially requesting the DGP.

The story now goes into a flashback where Aditya and Anjali are college sweethearts who break up because of a minor misunderstanding, after which Aditya reconciles and tries to reach her back, but then he meets with an accident and forgets his past. The story then returns to present, where Anjali gets involved with the investigation, but meets with a dead end at every corner. Finally, Aditya decides that he himself can solve the case, and the only problem is if he sleeps, he will forget. Hence, he decides not to sleep until the case is solved. Aditya tries to dig into his past and see if he can find any clues, and he finds out that Anjali was actually his girlfriend.

Finally, he calls up Madhumitha, and Anjali tells them that he has solved the case and asks them to come at 7:00 the next morning, when he will reveal the murderer. Aditya believes that Anjali might be the killer and waits for dawn. He controls himself the whole night, but just as it was about it be 7:00, his eyes finally give out, and he falls asleep. By the time he wakes up, he sees Anjali and Madhumitha holding guns against each other, and both ask him to help. Finally, Aditya shoots Madhumitha out of instinct, and she instantly dies.

Madhumitha's brother (Uttej) comes out and reveals the entire crime to Anjali. He confesses that his sister wanted to become the managing director of the company, but as Aditya is the legal heir, he will precede his uncle to that post. Hence she plans and becomes Aditya's girlfriend with an intent to steal the entire property, but his uncle came to know about that fact. Madhumitha and her brother then killed him and kept the dead body in Aditya's car so that the police may suspect him. The movie ends with Aditya marrying Anjali, who later on reminds him every morning about his past without him referring to a tape.

Cast

 Manoj Manchu as Adithya
 Sneha Ullal as Anjali
 Riya Sen as Madhumitha
 P. Vasu as Adithya's father
 Nassar as Adithya's uncle
 Brahmanandam as Barmani
 Sunil as Kishore
 Uttej as Madhumitha's brother
 Mallikarjuna Rao
 Noel Sean
 Surekha Vani
 Kausha Rach (special appearance in song)

Soundtrack
The soundtrack has music composed by Achu & Dharan. The music was released on 29 August 2008. Background Scores are done by Santhosh Narayanan & Shakti. The Tamil album features a remix of the song "Yennai Theriyuma" from Kudiyirundha Koyil.

See also
 Mithya

References

External links
 

2000s Telugu-language films
2008 films
Films scored by Achu Rajamani
Indian thriller films
Indian remakes of American films
Films scored by Dharan Kumar
2008 directorial debut films
2008 thriller films